Prince County is located in western Prince Edward Island, Canada. The county's defining geographic feature is Malpeque Bay, a sub-basin of the Gulf of St. Lawrence, which creates the narrowest portion of Prince Edward Island's landmass, an isthmus upon which the city of Summerside is located.

The geographic division created by Malpeque Bay is informally augmented by a socio-economic division between the more urban East Prince and rural West Prince, although the line of division generally varies.  Much of Prince Edward Island's industrial base is concentrated in the eastern part of the county, with three large frozen French fry manufacturing plants, a potato chip manufacturing plant, and an aerospace industry located at a former air force base.  Industrial farming for root crops such as potatoes accounts for the majority of rural economic activity, followed by fishing for shellfish such as lobster and crab.

The county was named by Capt. Samuel Holland in 1765 for George, Prince of Wales, who would later become King George IV (1762–1830). As such, Prince County's shire town was designated as Princetown, but the inferior harbour for Prince Royalty saw the settlement pattern change to give this honour to Summerside.

Demographics 

Transportation

Major Highways

Municipalities
Cities
Summerside
Towns
Alberton
Borden-Carleton
Kensington
O'Leary
Tignish
Municipalities
Abrams Village
Bedeque and Area
Central Prince
Elmsdale
Greenmount-Montrose
Kinkora
Linkletter
Lot 11 and Area
Malpeque Bay
Miminegash
Miscouche
Sherbrooke
St. Felix
St. Louis
Tignish Shore
Tyne Valley
Wellington
Unincorporated communities
Albany
Belmont
 Days Corner
Richmond
Union Corner
Indian reserves
Lennox Island 1

See also
Lady Slipper Drive

References

 Community Profile: Prince County, Prince Edward Island; Statistics Canada

 
Counties of Prince Edward Island
1765 establishments in the British Empire